László Róna (20 May 1913 — 20 May 2007) was a Hungarian ice hockey player. He played for the Hungarian national team at the 1936 Winter Olympics and several World Championships.

References

External links
 

1913 births
2007 deaths
Hungarian ice hockey forwards
Ice hockey players at the 1936 Winter Olympics
Olympic ice hockey players of Hungary
Ice hockey people from Budapest